Maria Magdalena Andrejczyk (born 9 March 1996) is a Polish track and field athlete who competes in the javelin throw. She is the 2020 Summer Olympics silver medalist and 2015 European Junior Champion. Her personal best of 71.40 m, set in 2021, is the Polish record as well as the third best result in the history of the women's javelin throw competition.

Career 
Andrejczyk competed at the 2015 World Championships in Beijing without qualifying for the final. She won the gold medal at the 2015 European Junior Championships.
 
Andrejczyk represented Poland at the 2016 Summer Olympics in Rio de Janeiro. On 16 August 2016, she achieved her personal best and a new Polish national record – 67.11 metres – while competing in the qualifying round. She went on to finish fourth in the final, missing out on a bronze medal by just two centimetres.

Soon after the Olympics she underwent an operation on the injured shoulder and lost the entire 2017 season. She returned to competition in June 2018 but could not build a good enough form for the 2018 European Championships in Berlin. The next season marked an improvement as she finished second at the 2019 European Team Championships Super League held on home soil in Bydgoszcz and qualified for the 2019 World Championships in Doha, where, however, she was eliminated in the qualifying round.

In the 2020 Summer Olympics held in Tokyo, Andrejczyk won the silver medal in the Women's Javelin Throw.

Personal life 
Since the end of 2018, Andrejczyk has been in a relationship with the Polish trainer Marcin Rosengarten.

Philanthropy
Maria Andrejczyk auctioned off her Tokyo Olympic silver medal to help fund the heart surgery of an 8-month-old baby. Zabka, a Polish store chain won the auction and returned her the medal.

Competition record

See also

Auctioned her medal for an 8 month old baby heart surgery. Zabka won the auction and then returned the medal to her. This is humanity at it's very best.

References

Polish female javelin throwers
Living people
People from Suwałki
People from Sejny County
1996 births
World Athletics Championships athletes for Poland
Athletes (track and field) at the 2016 Summer Olympics
Athletes (track and field) at the 2020 Summer Olympics
Olympic athletes of Poland
Olympic female javelin throwers
Medalists at the 2020 Summer Olympics
Olympic silver medalists in athletics (track and field)
Olympic silver medalists for Poland
Polish Catholics
21st-century Polish women